Lyubov Ilyina (born 10 March 1950) is a Soviet athlete. She competed in the women's long jump at the 1972 Summer Olympics.

References

1950 births
Living people
Athletes (track and field) at the 1972 Summer Olympics
Soviet female long jumpers
Olympic athletes of the Soviet Union
Place of birth missing (living people)